Satpal Maharaj (born 21 September 1951) is a spiritual master and an Indian politician, serving as the current PWD, tourism, cultural and irrigation minister in the cabinet of Government of Uttarakhand. He was born to Shri Hans Ji Maharaj and Shrimati Rajeshwari Devi Ji. He is also a National Executive Member of BJP. He is the founder of Manav Utthan Sewa Samiti.

Early life

Childhood
Satpal Maharaj was born as the eldest son of Shri Hans Ji Maharaj, a spiritual guru, and his second wife Rajeshwari Devi in a small town named Kankhal in Haridwar district. Since childhood ages, he had a keen interest in spirituality and often used to practice deep meditation techniques. His brothers Bhole Ji Maharaj and Prem Rawat are also spiritual gurus. 

He was sent to St. George's College, Mussorie for formal education to learn different languages and sciences. He manifested his interest for philosophical debates and practical sciences and won prizes for the same.

Discovery as a Spiritual Master
His father passed away in 1966, bequeathing him with the task of communicating the spiritual knowledge unto the world. Though earlier, he was not in the limelight, he was like a dynamo, the source of energy and light for the entire movement (established by his father), which picked up momentum under his mother's guidance. He used to address a large crowd of followers with his spiritual discourses at very young ages. His message is "God is neither Hindu, nor Muslim, nor Christian. God is one and is our father.

Young Satpal Maharaj often used to deliver spiritual discourses to awaken human values from within and used to tell about the great souls who are born to celebrate the victory of righteousness over wickedness, and they are born unto this world whose mission is to re-establish man's existence on this planet as a spiritual being. It is believed amongst his followers that the purpose of his birth is not merely the upholding of "dharma", but is above all for the exaltation of man in his most divine nature and state of consciousness, thus playing a role of mother, giving a new birth by awakening the spirit that lies dormant in him, in spite of physical birth. By revealing the pure self-effulgent light and the holy name (which are considered as the manifestations of the cosmic consciousness).

Recognition as a Social Figure
Satpal Maharaj claims to be a very unassuming and non-violent person of a resigning will. He further adds that he has a natural love for the poor and the innocent. His heart allegedly would never bear the miseries of others and he would immediately share the sufferings of others.

Since the early ages of his life, he has been a major social activist, bringing reforms for the betterment of the society. He had opened many non-profit clinics, stay homes, and brought other important services near to the people of remote areas, who do not have access to government schemes due to their geographical conditions. Until his teenage years, he became familiar with the problems faced by people living in mountainous remote areas of then Uttar Pradesh, and he out-reached to people living in such areas and stood with their demand of a separate state of Uttarakhand. He walked many marches with massive support for social causes. Also, he wanted to manifest the unmanifested in man by uniting the man's limited consciousness with the primordial, cosmic vibration. So, he set-up a socio-spiritual society, with the objective to uplift man from the morass of ignorance and superstition. The society is called "Manav Utthan Sewa Samiti", with its headquarters in Delhi, India.

Socio-Spiritual Initiatives
He has taken many measures to bring about changes in the society, by the means of preaching spiritual knowledge, and establishment of a socio-spiritual organization Manav Utthan Sewa Samiti.

Manav Utthan Sewa Samiti
He founded Manav Utthan Sewa Samiti. With the motive of preaching the meditation techniques called "Knowledge". He draws millions of people to his main ashrams in Haridwar and New Delhi. The Society stands for sanskritizing the lower classes in the society and sharing with them the joys and sorrows of life as brethren by providing them with spiritual succor. It fights for their enjoying all rights and against atrocities on the lower castes and condemns depriving their entry into the place of worship. The society is proud that its following is derived from all communities. Community lunch and commune living is a common feature of society.

Padyatras (Foot Marches) 
He headed many padayatras, both nationally and internationally, many noble social causes, and to bring awareness and peace in mankind. He is deeply connected to the motive of building a better, healthy, and contented society and has made many efforts to this end, as listed below:

Other Social Initiatives
Shri Satpal Maharaj Ji has undertaken many social initiatives by the means of the M.U.S.S., from time to time and day by day, every initiative aimed at either meant to uplift one spiritually or to elevate mankind.

Mission Education
This initiative was taken under the guidance of his son, Shri Shradhey Maharaj Ji, where they developed a model to supply the recurring stationery to the underprivileged of the society, who drop school due to lack of stationery. Under this initiative, the aim is to create a value system amongst the students of well-to-do families to care for the underprivileged and donate the excess of their stuff. This initiative focused on collection of items from well-off institutions and create awareness, and then making kits of necessary involved, and distributing them in underprivileged schools, so, there is no money involved at all. This is being run at the international level.
In May 2019, this initiative became the world's quickest and largest system to donate the stationery, making Search guinness world record.

Political career
Shri Satpal Maharaj is the current Cabinet Minister in the State of Government of Uttarakhand, serving as the Minister of Tourism, Irrigation, Culture.

Works in Uttarakhand

Role in the formation of Uttarakhand
He had played a vital role in the formation of Uttarakhand.

Rail Line Project

He inaugurated a survey to this project as a Union Minister, and Minister of Railways of State of Uttar Pradesh (Now, in Uttarakhand) way back in 1996. This project got budget allocation and other clearances from the government, it is said to be the longest tunnel rail project in the country, which will play a vital role in the security of the country, and livelihood of the people of Uttarakhand.
The Rishikesh to Karnprayag Rail Line is proposed to serve a very vital role in the country, for prompt movement of Army (as the geographical location of the line is near India-China Border), pilgrims and locals.
The foundation stone for the project survey was laid down by UPA chairperson Sonia Gandhi, way back on 9 November 2011 at Rishikesh, this was a 125-kilometer railway line project. The survey of the project completed somewhere by the year 2013, however, the project was delayed as the state ministers delayed to provide necessary land to Rail Vikas Nigam Limited (RVNL) for the commencement of the project construction due to nonfinalization of land acquisition rules of Uttarakhand.

Private bill in 8th schedule
He brought a private member's bill to include Garhwali and Kumaoni language in the Eighth Schedule of the Constitution of India.

Protein Revolution

Uttarakhand Government has inked a tourism promotion cum horticulture research agreement with Peru. State Government will have intergovernmental interaction of scientific communities from both the countries in order to boost horticulture and wool production in the State. According to Maharaj, the president of Peru will visit Uttarakhand in January to explore the possibilities and economic opportunities here. The MoU for tourism promotion was signed between the Uttarakhand tourism minister Amrita Rawat and Peru president Carlos Canales in the presence of the vice president of India Mohammed Hamid Ansari in their recent visit to Peru. As per agreement tourism officials and other related agencies of Peru will visit the State to study tourism activities and further possibilities of promotional chances here. Besides this Uttarakhand will also import seeds of Peru's native protein-rich high altitude cereal crop Quinoa to cultivate it here.

International activities
1. On 17 October 2011, He also delivered his Speech at 66th United Nations General Assembly session held in New York City on the topic "Sport for Peace and Development".

2. On 19 October 2011, he presented the statement by India in the First Committee Thematic Debate on Conventional Weapons at 66th United Nations General Assembly session held in New York City.

3. He and his wife Smt. Amrita Rawat jointly donated a bust of Mahatma Gandhi to KwaZulu-Natal provincial government, the bust was to be installed at the Pietermaritzburg Railway Station; a station where Mahatma Gandhi was thrown out of the train.

COVID-19 disease
Satpal Maharaj, his wife, and his 22 family and staff members tested positive for Covid-19 on 30 May 2020. Satpal Maharaj and his wife had been admitted to AIIMS hospital, Rishikesh and the couple recovered from novel coronavirus within 3 weeks of time and got discharged from AIIMS hospital, Rishikesh on 17 June 2020.

References

Bibliography

External links

 Manav Dharam
 Shree Satpal Ji Maharaj
 Shri Satpal Maharaj Profile

Bharatiya Janata Party politicians from Uttarakhand
1951 births
People from Haridwar
Living people
India MPs 1996–1997
Lok Sabha members from Uttarakhand
India MPs 2009–2014
Indian National Congress politicians
All India Indira Congress (Tiwari) politicians
Uttarakhand MLAs 2017–2022
People from Pauri Garhwal district
Irrigation Ministers of Uttarakhand
Uttarakhand MLAs 2022–2027